Shum is a surname in various cultures.

Origins

Shum may be the spelling of the Cantonese pronunciation of two Chinese surnames, listed below by their spelling in Pinyin (which reflects the Mandarin pronunciation):

 Cén, which originated as a toponymic surname..
 Shěn. It is nearly-homophonous with the above surname in Cantonese.

Shum is also an English surname. Early records of the surname in England in the International Genealogical Index of the Church of Jesus Christ of Latter-day Saints include one bearer in 1748 in London and another in 1768 in Toddington, Bedfordshire.

The German surname Shum is a variant spelling of Schum or Schumm, which originated as a toponymic surname after a place in Upper Saxony. It is also found as an Ashkenazi Jewish surname (Yiddish and ).

Statistics

According to statistics cited by Patrick Hanks, there were 342 people on the island of Great Britain and 21 on the island of Ireland with the surname Shum as of 2011. The 1881 United Kingdom census found 73 people with the surname, primarily in London and Staffordshire.

The 2010 United States Census found 2,222 people with the surname Shum, making it the 13,627th-most-common surname in the country. This represented an increase from 2,025 (13,724th-most-common) in the 2000 Census. In both censuses, about four-fifths of the bearers of the surname identified as Asian, and fourteen percent as White.

People

Chinese surname Cén
 John Shum (born 1952), Hong Kong actor and film producer
 Shum Kwok Pui (born 1970), Hong Kong footballer
 Harry Shum Jr. (born 1982), American actor
 Lester Shum (born 1993), Hong Kong social activist

Chinese surname Shěn
 Shen Hongying (1871-1935), also transcribed Shum Hung-ying, Chinese general in the Old Guangxi Clique
 Lydia Shum (1945–2008), Hong Kong actress
 Danny C. S. Shum (born 1960), Hong Kong horse trainer
 Harry Shum (born 1966), Chinese-born American computer scientist
 Mina Shum (born 1966), Hong Kong-born Canadian filmmaker

Other or unknown
 George Shum (1751–1805), English politician
 Jim Shum (1853–1914), Chinese-born New Zealand gold miner
 Itzhak Shum (born 1948), Israeli footballer
 Idan Shum (born 1976), Israeli footballer
 Kevin Shum (born 1997), American figure skater

References

Chinese-language surnames
English-language surnames
German-language surnames
Multiple Chinese surnames